The Eredivisie is a football league in the Netherlands. In the 1972–1973 season it was contested by 18 teams. Ajax won the championship.

League standings

Results

See also
 1972–73 Eerste Divisie
 1972–73 KNVB Cup

References

 Eredivisie official website - info on all seasons 
 RSSSF

Eredivisie seasons
Netherlands
1